The Hillhead Centre (formally known as Keith Park) is a sports stadium in the Old Aberdeen area of Aberdeen, Scotland. It is owned and managed by the University of Aberdeen.

It consists of a floodlit, grass football pitch with a 300-capacity seated stand and a floodlit artificial pitch used for hockey and training. There is a fully equipped pavilion with conference rooms and physiotherapy suite.

Currently, the stadium is used for football matches in the North Region Juniors by Aberdeen University's first team and Bridge of Don Thistle. It is also used for matches and training of various university sports teams.

References

Sports venues in Aberdeen
Football venues in Aberdeen
Student sport in Scotland
University of Aberdeen
University sports venues in the United Kingdom